Phlegmariurus dentatus is a species of plant in the family Lycopodiaceae, endemic to the Portuguese archipelagos of the Azores and Madeira. In the Azores, it appears in sloping areas, woods, forests and sometimes on road sides, being less demanding in humidity than Huperzia suberecta (there are places in Terceira where the two species coexist). It is native to seven of the nine islands. In the archipelago of Madeira it only occurs on the island of Madeira.

References

dentatus
Taxa named by William Trelease
Flora of the Azores
Flora of Madeira
Endemic flora of Macaronesia
Taxobox binomials not recognized by IUCN